The Chughtai Moghols or Chughtai Mughals are descendants and followers of Chaghtai Khan (the second son of Genghis Khan and the founder of Chaghtai Khanate) in South Asia (modern-day Pakistan). They migrated to this region from Central Asia after the Mughal Conquest of India. The Chughtai Mughals are primarily found in Azad Kashmir and northern Punjab, Pakistan. They have surnames such as Mirza, Baig and Khan.

See also
 11417 Chughtai
 Abdur Rahman Chughtai
 Babur
 Chagatai Khan
 Chagatai Khanate
 Chagatai language
 Ismat Chughtai

References 

Mughal clans of Pakistan
Surnames
Turkic culture
Mongol peoples
Turkic-language surnames
Urdu-language surnames
Ethnonymic surnames
Ethnic groups in Pakistan
 Pakistani people of Turkic descent
Pakistani people of Mongol descent